Electronic Music Systems may refer to:
Electronic music systems
Novation Electronic Music Systems